Must Have Been Love is a 2012 Norwegian-Finnish romantic drama film directed by Eirik Svensson. The film was Svensson's directorial debut, and stars Pamela Tola and Espen Klouman Høiner. It was shot in Oslo, Helsinki, Istanbul and Berlin.

Cast
Pamela Tola as Kaisa
Espen Klouman Høiner as Jacob / Andreas
Mattis Herman Nyquist as August
Audun Hjort as Audun
Laura Birn as Anna
Pihla Viitala as Helmi

References

External links

2012 films
2012 romantic drama films
2012 multilingual films
Norwegian romantic drama films
Finnish romantic drama films
2010s English-language films
English-language Norwegian films
English-language Finnish films
2010s Norwegian-language films
2010s Finnish-language films
Films shot in Istanbul
Films shot in Norway
Films shot in Finland
Finnish multilingual films
Norwegian multilingual films
Films shot in Berlin
2012 directorial debut films